Snooker world rankings 2012/2013: The professional world rankings for all the professional snooker players who qualified for the 2012–13 season are listed below. The rankings worked as a two-year rolling list. The points for each tournament two years ago were removed, when the corresponding tournament during the current season has finished. The following table contains the rankings, which were used to determine the seedings for certain tournaments.

Notes

 No player is listed outside the top 64 in revision 1, as these players began the season without ranking points.
 Revision 1 was used for the seeding of the Wuxi Classic, Australian Goldfields Open, Six-red World Championship and Shanghai Masters.
 Revision 2 was used for the seeding of the International Championship.
 Revision 3 was used for the seeding of the UK Championship, Masters, German Masters and Snooker Shoot-Out.
 Revision 4 was used for the seeding of the Welsh Open, World Open and China Open.
 Revision 5 was used for the seeding of the World Championship.
 Joe Jogia was banned from all WPBSA events for the whole 2012/2013 season, and was removed from the official rankings following the 2013 Munich Open, after his WPBSA membership was terminated.

References

2012
Rankings 2013
Rankings 2012